Saldoidini is a tribe of shore bugs in the family Saldidae. There are more than 20 genera and 250 described species in Saldoidini.

Genera
These 22 genera belong to the tribe Saldoidini:

 Aoteasalda Larivière & Larochelle, 2016
 Calacanthia Reuter, 1891
 Capitonisalda J. Polhemus, 1981
 Capitonisaldoida J. Polhemus & D. Polhemus, 1991
 Chartosaldoida Cobben, 1987
 Chartoscirta Stål, 1868
 Halosalda Reuter, 1912
 Ioscytus Reuter, 1912
 Kiwisaldula Larivière & Larochelle, 2016
 Macrosaldula Southwood & Leston, 1959
 Mascarenisalda J. Polhemus & D. Polhemus, 1991
 Micracanthia Reuter, 1912
 Oiosalda Drake & Hoberlandt, 1952
 Orthophrys Horváth, 1911
 Orthosaldula Gapud, 1986
 Pseudosaldula Cobben, 1961
 Rupisalda J. Polhemus, 1985
 Saldoida Osborn, 1901
 Saldula Van Duzee, 1914
 Sinosalda Vinokurov, 2004
 Zemacrosaldula Larivière & Larochelle, 2015
 † Helenasaldula Cobben, 1976

References

Further reading

External links

 

 
Saldidae
Hemiptera tribes
Articles created by Qbugbot